Seeheim-Jugenheim is a municipality in the Darmstadt-Dieburg district in Hesse, Germany.  It has a population of approximately 17,000.

Seeheim-Jugenheim consists of seven villages:

Balkhausen (population 693)
Jugenheim (population 4,448)
Malchen (population 1,004)
Ober-Beerbach (population 1,269)
Seeheim (population 9,060)
Steigerts (population 81)
Stettbach (population 144)

The municipality was formed on January 1, 1977 through the unification of the previously separate municipalities of Seeheim and Jugenheim.  Until January 1, 1978 the municipality was known as Seeheim; after that it became known as Seeheim-Jugenheim.

It is known for its mountain bike trails to the nearby mountain Melibokus.

Seeheim-Jugenheim has been home to several notable residents throughout history, including Tsar Nicholas II of Russia as well as writers Georg Kaiser and Helene Christaller.

Further it has been an ancient Jewish Community.

Industrial and commercial activity in Seeheim-Jugenheim is close to nonexistent; thus, most of its residents work in the nearby cities of Darmstadt, Frankfurt or Heidelberg.

Notable people
 Christian Alvart (born 1974), German filmmaker
 Georg-Christof Bertsch (born 1959), German designer
 Walter Christaller (1893-1969), German geographer
 Hans-Joachim Heist (born 1949), German actor and comedian
 Eleonore Marguerre (born 1978), German opera singer
 Uwe Scholz (1958-2004), German ballet dancer and choreographer
 Gabriele Britz (born 1968) German jurist

See also
 Guggenheim (disambiguation)
 State International School Seeheim

Twin towns
 Villenave d'Ornon, France, since 1982
 Kosmonosy, Czech Republic, since 1997
 Ceregnano, Italy, since 2008
 Karlovo, Bulgaria, since 2018

References

Darmstadt-Dieburg
Historic Jewish communities